Michael Gleeson may refer to:
Michael Gleeson (hurler) (born 1955), Irish hurling player
Michael Gleeson (politician) (born 1946), Irish politician and former GAA football player
Mike Gleeson, a character on the Irish soap opera Fair City

See also
Michael Gleason (disambiguation)